Ismail Tara (16 November 1949 – 24 November 2022), born Muhammad Ismail Merchant, was a Pakistani actor and comedian. 

Beginning in 1964, he worked in stage plays, television serials and Lollywood films till his death in 2022. 

He was best-known for his work in Fifty Fifty, which aired on PTV in the 1980s. 

He was a five time Nigar Awards winner for the best comedian in Haathi Mere Saathi (1993), Aakhri Mujra (1994), Munda Bigra Jaye (1995), Chief Sahib (1996) and Deewarein (1998).

Early life 
Tara was born Muhammad Ismail Merchant in Karachi into a Gujurati-speaking Memon business family, and began his career in 1964, at the age of 15, when he got a role in a play staged by a small theatre.

Career
Tara first rose to prominence when he became a part of the Zia Mohyeddin Show in 1972-1973.

Tara is best-known for the popular TV show Fifty Fifty, ending up writing some of its scripts along with fellow TV comedian Majid Jahangir when the original scriptwriter Anwar Maqsood had a fall-out with the show's cast in 1981.

Personal life and death
Tara had to perform a comedy theater the same day his 8 year’s old son died. After his performance, he told the audience about his son’s death.

Tara died due to kidney failure in Karachi on 24 November 2022, at the age of 73.

Filmography

Television 

 Fifty Fifty - 1980s
Gharama - 1987
 Rubber Band - 2005
 Mamoo -2007
 Choki number 420 - 2008
 Yeh Zindagi Hai - 2008
 Nadaaniyan
 One Way Ticket - 2012
 Pak Villa - 2012
 Dheeli Colony - 2012
 Orangi Ki Anwari  2013
 Bulbulay
 Jinn Ki Aayegi Baraat 2018
 Mirchiyaan  2018
 Namak Paray 2018
 Barfi Laddu 2019
 Bhai Bhai   2019
 Woh Pagal Si 2022

Stage plays 

 Soney Ki Chirya (Punjabi)
 Mehndi Lagi Mere Hath (Punjabi)
 Wah Wah Moin Akhtar (Urdu)
 Tere Nakhre Hazar (Punjabi)
 Pholay Badshah (Punjabi)

Cartoon 

 Donkey Raja Chacha character on Geo TV

Awards and nominations

 Nigar Awards: Winner for best comedian for Haathi Mere Saathi in 1993 
 Nigar Awards: Winner for best comedian for Aakhri Mujran 1994 
 Nigar Awards: Winner for best comedian for Munda Bigra Jaye in 1995
 Nigar Awards: Winner for best comedian for Chief Sahib in 1996
 Nigar Awards: Winner for best comedian for Deewarein in 1998
 The first Indus Drama Awards: Nominated for Best Actor Sitcom in a Leading Role and received Award for TV Comedy Series Fifty Fifty (1980s)
 The 1st Indus Drama Awards: Nominated for Best Actor Sitcom in a Leading Role and received Award for TV Comedy Series Fifty Fifty (1980s)

References

External links 
 

1949 births
2022 deaths
Memon people
Pakistani people of Gujarati descent
Pakistani male film actors
Pakistani male stage actors
Pakistani male television actors
Pakistani male comedians
Male actors from Karachi
Nigar Award winners
Male actors in Urdu cinema
20th-century Pakistani male actors
21st-century Pakistani male actors